At the Battle of Cynoscephalae (364 BC), the Theban forces of Pelopidas fought against the Thessalian troops of Alexander of Pherae in a battle in which Pelopidas was killed; nevertheless, the Thebans won. The next year, the Theban general Epaminondas avenged Pelopidas' death by a victory over Alexander.

References

Cynoscephalae (364 BC)
Cynoscephalae (364 BC)
364 BC
Cynoscephalae (364 BC)
Theban hegemony